The United States House of Representatives elections in California, 1871 were elections for California's delegation to the United States House of Representatives, which occurred on September 6, 1871. Republicans gained both Democratic districts.

Results
Final results from the Clerk of the House of Representatives:

District 1

District 2

District 3

See also
42nd United States Congress
Political party strength in California
Political party strength in U.S. states
United States House of Representatives elections, 1870

References
California Elections Page
Office of the Clerk of the House of Representatives

External links
California Legislative District Maps (1911-Present)
RAND California Election Returns: District Definitions

1871
California United States House of Representatives
1871 United States House of Representatives elections